The Glärnisch is a mountain massif of the Schwyz Alps, overlooking the valley of the Linth in the Swiss canton of Glarus. It consists of several summits, of which the highest, Bächistock, is 2,915 metres above sea level. Until 2013, the highest point was considered to be an unnamed point with a summit cross at 2,914 metres (until 2013: 2'915 metres). The other main summits are Vrenelisgärtli ("Verena's Little Garden" at 2,904 metres) and the Ruchen (2,901 metres).

The massif of the Glärnisch consists of two ridges of either side of the glacier named Glärnischfirn, culminating at the Ruchen to the west, rising more than 2,000 metres above the Klöntalersee, and at the Bächistock to the southwest. The Vrenelisgärtli is the closest peak to Schwanden.

The Glärnischfirn (also known as the Glärnischgletscher, the "Glarnisch Glacier") is about one mile long and about one-half mile wide at between 1.5 and 2.0 miles above sea level. The surrounding peaks are generally accessible to hikers and climbers only by traversing the length of the glacier itself. From the Vrenelisgärtli peak, the Lake Klontal may be seen directly, more than one mile below.

In recent years, the glacier has lost a massive amount of its volume and its tongue has retreated sharply.

East of the Glärnisch is located the lower Vorder Glärnisch.

See also
 North-Eastern Swiss Alps
 List of mountains of the canton of Glarus
 List of most isolated mountains of Switzerland

References

External links

Glärnisch on Hikr
Glärnisch (Vrenelisgärtli) on Summitpost

Mountains of Switzerland
Glaciers of Switzerland
Mountains of the canton of Glarus
Mountains of the Alps
Two-thousanders of Switzerland